The Eclogues, also called the Bucolics, is the first of the three major works of the Latin poet Virgil.

Background
Taking as his generic model the Greek bucolic poetry of Theocritus, Virgil created a Roman version partly by offering a dramatic and mythic interpretation of revolutionary change at Rome in the turbulent period between roughly 44 and 38 BC. Virgil introduced political clamor largely absent from Theocritus' poems, called idylls ("little scenes" or "vignettes"), even though erotic turbulence disturbs the "idyllic" landscapes of Theocritus.

Virgil's book contains ten pieces, each called not an idyll but an eclogue ("draft" or "selection" or "reckoning"), populated by and large with herdsmen imagined conversing and performing amoebaean singing in largely rural settings, whether suffering or embracing revolutionary change or happy or unhappy love. Performed with great success on the Roman stage, they feature a mix of visionary politics and eroticism that made Virgil a celebrity, legendary in his own lifetime.

Structure and organization 

Like the rest of Virgil's works, the Eclogues are composed in dactylic hexameter.

It is likely that Virgil deliberately designed and arranged his book of Eclogues, in which case it is the first extant collection of Latin poems in the same meter put together by the poet. (Although it is thought that Catullus also compiled his book of poetry, it consists of poems written in different meters).

Several scholars have attempted to identify the organizational/architectural principles underpinning the construction of the book. The book is arguably based on an alternation of antiphonal poems (e.g., dialogues) with non-dramatic/narrative poems. Beyond this, there have been many attempts (with little consensus) to identify other organizational principles. Many of these attempts have been catalogued and critiqued by Niall Rudd. Rudd refuted a number of cruder organizational theories, including theories that the Eclogues are organized
 in chronological order
 by geographic setting, with Italian settings alternating with non-Italian settings
 into two halves, each featuring a movement from lighter, more peaceful poems to heavier, more emphatic and agitated poems

Rudd also identified more-convoluted organizational theories. While considering these more plausible than the above, he concluded that "each system has at least one defect, and none is so superior to the others as to be obviously Virgil's own". Such systems include:
 arrangement based on mutually supporting principles, such as topical and arithmetic correspondences
 arrangement into a series of pairs of poems, bracketing Eclogue 5 with the balancing Eclogue 10 and supported by arithmetical correspondence (i.e., length of poems)
 arrangement into two halves, with corresponding pairs based on length

More recently, Thomas K. Hubbard has noted, "The first half of the book has often been seen as a positive construction of a pastoral vision, whilst the second half dramatizes progressive alienation from that vision, as each poem of the first half is taken up and responded to in reverse order."

Eclogue 1
A dialogue between Tityrus and Meliboeus. In the turmoil of the era Meliboeus has been forced off his land and faces an uncertain future. Tityrus recounts his journey to Rome and the "god" he met there who answered his plea and allowed him to remain on his land. He offers to let Meliboeus spend the night with him. This text has been viewed as a satire of the infamous land-confiscations after the return of Mark Antony and Octavian's joint forces from the Battle of Philippi of 42 BCE, in which Brutus and Cassius (the orchestrators of Caesar's assassination in 44 BCE) were defeated.

Eclogue 2
A monologue by the shepherd Corydon bemoaning his unrequited love for Alexis in the height of summer.

Eclogue 3
A singing competition between Menalcas and Damoetas. Palaemon is the judge and pronounces the contest a tie.

Eclogue 4

Capping a sequence or cycle in which Virgil created and augmented a new political mythology, Eclogue 4 reaches out to imagine a golden age ushered in by the birth of a boy heralded as "great increase of Jove" (magnum Iovis incrementum), which ties in with divine associations claimed in the propaganda of Octavian, the ambitious young heir to Julius Caesar. The poet makes this notional scion of Jove the occasion to predict his own metabasis up the scale in epos, rising from the humble range of the bucolic to the lofty range of the heroic, potentially rivaling Homer: he thus signals his own ambition to make Roman epic that will culminate in the Aeneid. In the surge of ambition, Virgil also projects defeating the legendary poet Orpheus and his mother, the epic muse Calliope, as well as Pan, the inventor of the bucolic pipe, even in Pan's homeland of Arcadia, which Virgil will claim as his own at the climax of his eclogue book in the tenth eclogue. Biographical identification of the fourth eclogue's child has proved elusive; but the figure proved a link between traditional Roman authority and Christianity. The connection is first made in the Oration of Constantine appended to the Life of Constantine by Eusebius of Caesarea (a reading to which Dante makes fleeting reference in his Purgatorio). Some scholars have also remarked similarities between the eclogue's prophetic themes and the words of Isaiah 11:6: "a little child shall lead".

Eclogue 5
Eclogue 5 articulates another significant pastoral theme, the shepherd-poet's concern with achieving worldly fame through poetry. This concern is related to the metabasis Virgil himself undertakes thematically in Eclogue 4. In Eclogue 5, the shepherds Menalcas and Mopsus mourn their deceased companion Daphnis by promising to "praise ... Daphnis to the stars – / yes, to the stars raise Daphnis". Menalcas and Mopsus praise Daphnis out of compassion but also out of obligation. Daphnis willed that his fellow shepherds memorialize him by making a "mound and add[ing] above the mound a song: / Daphnis am I in woodland, known hence far as the stars". Not only are Daphnis's survivors concerned with solidifying and eternizing his poetic reputation, but the dead shepherd-poet himself is involved in self-promotion from beyond the grave through the aegis of his will. It is an outgrowth of the friendly poetic rivalries that occur between them and of their attempts to best the gods, usually Pan or Phoebus, at their lyric craft. At the end of Eclogue 5, Daphnis is deified in the shepherds' poetic praise: "A god, a god is he, Menalcas!' / ... Here are four altars: / Look, Daphnis, two for you and two high ones for Phoebus." Menalcas apostrophizes Daphnis with a promise: "Always your honor, name and praises will endure." Ensuring poetic fame is a fundamental interest of the shepherds in classical pastoral elegies, including the speaker in Milton's "Lycidas".

Eclogue 6 
This eclogue tells the story of how two boys, Chromis and Mnasyllos, and a Naiad persuaded Silenus to sing to them, and how he sang to them of the world's beginning, the Flood, the Golden Age, Prometheus, Hylas, Pasiphaë, Atalanta and Phaëthon's sisters; after which he described how the Muses gave Gallus (a close personal friend of Virgil's) Hesiod's reed pipe and commissioned him to write a didactic poem; after which he told of Scylla (whom Virgil identifies as both the sea monster and the daughter of Nisos who was transmuted into a seabird) and of Tereus and Philomela, and then we learn that he has in fact been singing a song composed by Apollo on the banks of the Eurotas.

Eclogue 7 
The goatherd Meliboeus, a recurring character, soliloquizing remembers how he happened to be present at a great singing match between Corydon and Thyrsis. He then quotes from memory their actual songs (six round of matching quatrains) and recalls that Daphnis as judge declared Corydon the winner. This eclogue is based on pseudo-Theocritus Idyll VIII, though there the quatrains are not in hexameters but in elegiac couplets. Scholars argue about why Thyrsis loses. The reader may feel that despite the very close parallelism of his quatrains with Corydon's, they are less musical and sometimes cruder in content.

Eclogue 8
This eclogue is also known as Pharmaceutria ("Sorceress"). The poet reports the contrasting songs of two shepherds whose music is as powerful as that of Orpheus. Both songs are dramatic (the character in the first being a man and in the second a woman), both have refrain and both, as printed, comprise ten sections of exactly the same length, though the correspondence in the last three sections is staggered. Amaryllis assists Alphesiboeus with a love spell.

Eclogue 9 
This poem dramatizes the preliminaries of a friendly singing-match that never takes place. Young Lycidas meets old Moeris on his way to town and learns that Moeris's master, the poet Menalcas, has been evicted from his small farm and nearly killed. They proceed to recall snatches of Menalcas's poetry, two translated from Theocritus and two relating to contemporary events. Lycidas is anxious for a singing-match, while admitting that he is no match for two contemporary Roman poets whom he mentions by name, but Moeris pleads for forgetfulness and loss of voice. They walk on towards the city, postponing the competition until Menalcas arrives.

Eclogue 10
In Eclogue 10, Virgil caps his book by inventing a new myth of poetic authority and origin: he replaces Theocritus' Sicily and old bucolic hero, the impassioned oxherd Daphnis, with the impassioned voice of his contemporary Roman friend, the elegiac poet Gaius Cornelius Gallus, imagined dying of love in Arcadia. Virgil transforms this remote, mountainous, and myth-ridden region of Greece, homeland of Pan, into the original and ideal place of pastoral song, thus founding a richly resonant tradition in western literature and the arts.

This eclogue is the origin of the phrase omnia vincit amor ("love conquers all").

See also
Aeneid
Georgics
The Golden Bough

References

Further reading 
 Buckham, Philip Wentworth; Spence, Joseph; Holdsworth, Edward; Warburton, William; Jortin, John, Miscellanea Virgiliana: In Scriptis Maxime Eruditorum Virorum Varie Dispersa, in Unum Fasciculum Collecta, Cambridge: Printed for W. P. Grant; 1825.

|

External links

The Eclogues (Internet Classics Archive)
The Eclogues (translated by H.R. Fairclough for the Loeb Classical Library)
 
 
French translations (Bibliotheca Classica Selecta)
Latin texts and German translations
An appreciation by Samuel Johnson
 

1st-century BC Latin books
Poetry by Virgil
LGBT poetry